The Chevrolet Colorado, and its counterpart, the GMC Canyon, are series of compact and later mid-sized pickup trucks marketed by American automaker General Motors. They were introduced in 2004 to replace the Chevrolet S-10 and GMC S-15/Sonoma compact pickups. It is named for the U.S. state of Colorado.



First generation (2004)

The Chevrolet Colorado and its twin, the GMC Canyon were jointly designed by GM's North American operations, GM's Brazil operations, and Isuzu, which began selling its own version worldwide in 2002. In late 2005, Isuzu offered a version in North America called the Isuzu i-series. This North American model Isuzu shared North American powertrains, styling, and equipment with the Colorado/Canyon twins and differed from Isuzu's worldwide offering. All Chevrolet, GMC, and Isuzu versions worldwide are based on the GMT355, itself the basis for the GMT 345-based Hummer H3. Most vehicles for markets outside North America are manufactured at a GM plant in Rayong, Thailand. All North American-market vehicles were manufactured by Shreveport Operations.

The cooperation between GM and Isuzu to build a light-duty truck and offer it in North America returns to an original arrangement the two companies had in the 1970s with the Chevrolet LUV, a rebadged Isuzu Faster.

Markets

North America

The Colorado/Canyon trucks in the North American market offer both manual and automatic transmissions. GM also offers either a rear-wheel drive (4x2) or four-wheel drive (4x4) drivetrain with standard, extended, and four-door crew-cab body styles. Most models come with the  LK5 I4 engine as standard, but a more powerful 3.5 I5 comes with the Z71 package on four-door versions and is optional on all others. The 4-door Z71s also get the four-speed automatic transmission standard. This package was later dropped in favor of LT2 and LT3.

The Colorado was offered in three basic trim levels: Base, LS, and LT, while the Canyon was also offered in three trim levels, but with different names: Canyon, SLE, and SLT.

Three different cab configurations were offered on Colorado and Canyon: a two-door regular-cab model with a  box and seating for either two or three passengers, a four-door extended-cab model with a  box and seating for either four or five passengers, and a four-door crew-cab model with a shorter  box and seating for either five or six passengers. Top trim levels in crew-cab configuration offered upscale features such as leather-trimmed seating surfaces, dual power-adjustable front bucket seats with lumbar support and heat, a six-disc, in-dash CD changer, XM satellite radio, and rear side-impact airbags.

Three different suspension options were offered on the Colorado and Canyon: The base Z85 suspension offered a comfortable ride quality. The Z/71 Off-Road suspension added a locking rear differential axle (RPO code G80) and heavier-duty shock absorbers for improved performance off-road, also offering an increased ride height for better clearance. The ZQ8 Sport suspension (see below) offered a lower ride height than the standard Z85 suspension, as well as firmer suspension for improved handling. All suspension packages were offered on 4x2 or 4x4 models in all cab configurations, except for the ZQ8 Sport suspension, which was only offered on 4x2 models.

A ZQ8 edition is available with a lower and more road-tuned "sport" suspension than the standard Z85 and comes with 17 inch wheels, color-matched bumper and grille, and low profile fender flares. There is also a Xtreme edition of the ZQ8 which has a different front bumper, rear bumper, side skirts, fender flares, grille, headlights, and 18-inch wheels. The Xtreme edition is basically a continuation of a trim package from its predecessor, the Chevrolet S-10.

For 2007, Colorado/Canyon was facelifted and offered new engines, which include the  LLV I4 and  LLR I5 which were both introduced due to numerous head problems, new colors — Deep Ruby (Sonoma Red for the Canyon), Pace Blue (Sport Blue for the Canyon), and Imperial Blue (Midnight Blue for the Canyon), and new tires and wheels. Minor changes to the grille and interior for the LT and LTZ models; the LS models kept the same pre-facelift look, similar to the facelift of the TrailBlazer in 2005. In addition, the "Colorado" and "Canyon" badges were phased out from the doors in favor of GM's corporate logo. For the 2010 model year, the GM badges were phased out, although a few 2010 models had the GM logo on the doors.

In 2009, both trucks, as with most 2009 GM vehicles (and combined with OnStar), received a Bluetooth hands-free phone system for the first time as optional equipment. The six-disc in-dash CD changer was discontinued as well, leaving the single-disc CD/MP3 player, and a standard A/M-F/M only radio, with two-, four-, or six-speaker audio systems. Most later trucks received alloy wheels as standard equipment, with optional polished and chrome-plated wheels, in 16, 17, or 18-inch diameters. Only later base-model trucks, with the exception of the base received 16-inch steel wheels, and were a new wheel design. In addition, most newer trucks also featured standard SiriusXM satellite radio, when equipped with a CD/MP3 player.

Colorado/Canyon U.S. sales peaked in 2005 at 163,204 units, surpassing the perennial segment leader, the Ford Ranger, by almost 35% and just 3.3% behind the new best-seller, the Toyota Tacoma. In 2006, however, while still leading the Ford pickup by 27.5%, Colorado/Canyon's sales lagged their Toyota competitor's by almost 34%. One 2005 Canyon owned by successful U.S. Senate candidate Scott Brown became famous as it was widely featured in his TV advertisements.

Safety
In the Insurance Institute for Highway Safety's frontal offset test the Colorado (extended version) is given a "Good" overall score, however the crew cab is rated "Acceptable". In the side impact test, the Colorado crew cab is rated "Poor" with or without side curtain airbags. Side curtain airbags were made standard on all 2010 models; side torso airbags are not offered.

Isuzu i-series

The Isuzu i-series midsized pickup truck line was manufactured from 2005 to 2008. Launched at the 2005 New York International Auto Show, for the 2006 model year, the i-series replaced the Hombre, which had been out of production since 2000. Like the Hombre, which was based on the compact Chevrolet S-10/GMC Sonoma, the i-series was based on the Chevrolet Colorado/GMC Canyon. Two models were offered at launch: the i-280, powered by the 2.8 L I4 engine, and the i-370, powered by the 3.7 L I5 engine. The i-280 was available only with an extended cab, while the i-370 could be had with either an extended cab or crew cab. The i-280 was replaced by the i-290 for 2007 with the introduction of a 2.9 L engine.

The sales for the i-series were poor, with just 1,377 sold from the start of production through February 2006 according to Automotive News. As part of Isuzu's withdrawal from the United States market after the 2008 model year, the i-series was discontinued.

Thailand

GM Thailand manufactured the Colorado from March 2004 with a mildly altered styling compared to the North American version. In late January 2006, Chevrolet introduced a G-80 differential lock system as optional for most Colorado trim levels. This feature is not available on the D-Max. Thai-market Colorados received a minor redesign in late 2007, with the front fascia being altered by toning down the American influence. The facelifted model was exported to Australia as the Holden Colorado from 2008.

In 2008, GM also introduced the Colorado 4x2 2.5 with diesel dual fuel system via CNG tank. It is switchable between diesel fuel and compressed natural gas with the ratio of 65:35. It is also compatible with pure diesel and biodiesel B5 fuel. Location of the tank is on the bed behind the cab. It was available for two cab styles.

Australasia
The Colorado was released in Australia and New Zealand in 2008 as the Holden Colorado. It replaced the D-Max-based Holden Rodeo due to the split between General Motors and Isuzu. Imported from Thailand, it is essentially a rebadged version of the facelifted Thai-specification Colorado, retaining its front styling. As with the Rodeo, the Colorado is available as either 4x2 or 4x4 and in a range of body styles, including single-cab, space-cab, and crew-cab. Power is provided by a range of gasoline and diesel engines. Of the gasoline engines, Holden offers a 2.4-liter four-cylinder and the Australian-made 3.6-liter Alloytec engine. The diesel powerplant is a four-cylinder Isuzu 4JJ1 unit displacing 3.0 liters. It was replaced by the second-generation Holden Colorado in 2012.

Engines

Second generation (RG; 2011)

In March 2011, Chevrolet revealed the prototype version of the all-new Colorado at Bangkok International Motor Show. It was shown as an extended cab with a rear access system, and some of the high-tech equipment. In June 2011, Chevrolet revealed its crew cab in adventure concept at Buenos Aires, Argentina (this car also shown at Frankfurt Motor Show in September 2011), and in July 2011, a Holden version of crew-cab version concept  got its premiere at Australian International Motor Show.

The production model is available in three different cab styles: regular cab (single cab), extended cab (space cab), and crew cab (double cab), and may either be 4x2 or 4x4.

On 9 September 2011, General Motors (Thailand) opened the diesel engine manufacturing plant, to make the Duramax engine used by the Colorado. The engine is a rebranded VM Motori turbodiesel engine with 2.5- or 2.8-liter, paired with a manual or automatic transmission.

Markets

Australasia
The Colorado was revealed at the 2011 Australian International Motor Show and went on sale in June 2012 in both Australia and New Zealand, sourced from the Rayong factory in Thailand. In Australia and New Zealand, the Colorado is badged as a Holden. Only one engine is offered, the 2.8 L turbo diesel, built by GM in the Rayong factory. It is available in four trim levels: DX (single cab chassis only), LX (chassis only), LT, and LTZ. Single-cab and crew-cab models are available as either 4x2 or 4x4.

The facelifted Colorado model for the Australian and New Zealand markets was released in 2017 with GM's MyLink infotainment system including Apple CarPlay and Android Auto smartphone mirroring. The model is built in right-hand drive at the GM Thailand plant.

A Thunder Edition is available on 4x4 LX, LT, and LTZ models. Among the features included with the pack are a nudge bar and towing kit, front carpet floor mats and a one-piece rear carpet floor mat, a bonnet protector, slimline weather shields, and "Thunder" badging.

Production of the Colorado in Thailand ended in 2020 as General Motors ended operations in the country. A refresh in line with the global Colorado was planned for the 2021 model year.

Trim levels
 DX features a manual transmission, electronic stability control, side-curtain airbags, Bluetooth capabilities, and 16-inch steel wheels.
 LX features either a six-speed manual or six-speed automatic transmission, power mirrors, and cruise control.
 LT features fog lamps.
 LTZ features 17-inch alloy wheels, optional leather seats, LED taillamps, projector headlamps, sports bar, soft tonneau cover, and side steps.
 Z71, the top trim, includes off-road gear and 18-inch wheels.

North America

The North American model was revealed on November 20, 2013, at the Los Angeles Auto Show. Production began at Wentzville Assembly in 2014, and vehicles started arriving at dealerships nationwide by mid- to late 2014, as an early 2015 model year vehicle. It competes with other midsized pickup truck offerings.

The North American model features a different front fascia, with its design being similar to the 2014 Chevrolet Silverado, and different engines. The North American Colorado's frame is 40% lighter than the global version despite the fact that it uses high-strength steel, and is much longer. General Motors' Wentzville assembly plant received a $380 million expansion of 500,000 sq ft that was constructed to support the new Colorado's assembly. In September 2014, GM added workers to the Wentzville factory after it received advanced orders of 30,000 Colorado/Canyons from its dealerships.

For the initial launch, the Colorado was available with either a 2.5 L Ecotec I4 engine or the 3.6 L LFX V6 engine. The 2.8 L Duramax LWN turbodiesel engine was added in 2016, and is a first for its class in the US market. It is also available in three cab configurations: extended cab with a  bed, crew cab with a  bed, or crew cab with a  bed, with four-wheel drive being optional.

Sixteen- or 17-inch steel wheels or alloy wheels are available, as well as a decor package for the W/T model that adds a chrome front grille and body-colored door handles and side-view mirrors.

Trim levels
 Base trim level (2015-2020)
 WT base trim level ("Work Truck")
 LT midlevel trim and most common
 Z71, the top trim, includes off-road equipment.
 ZR2 for off-road performance is the halo model.

The base Colorado trim level includes as standard equipment: 16-inch steel wheels, vinyl seating surfaces, an A/M-F/M stereo with auxiliary audio input and a six-speaker audio system, power windows and door locks (no keyless entry), a 2.5 L EcoTec I4 gasoline engine, a six-speed manual transmission (until mid-2019, when the manual transmission was discontinued and a six-speed automatic transmission became standard), carpeted flooring, and a chrome front grille. This model is available exclusively as an extended cab.

The W/T includes the same standard equipment as the base Colorado trim level, but has more optional equipment, such as a seven-inch color touch-screen MyLink radio, cloth seating surfaces, keyless entry, 16-inch aluminum-alloy wheels, color-keyed door mirrors, an automatic transmission, and a 3.6 L V6 gasoline engine. It is available as either an extended cab, or as a crew cab with either a short or long box.

The LT adds this equipment to the base Colorado and W/T trim levels: 17-inch aluminum-alloy wheels,  3.6 L V6 gasoline engine, automatic transmission, eight-inch color touch-screen MyLink radio, SiriusXM satellite radio, OnStar with 4G LTE Wi-Fi connectivity (later models only), cloth seating surfaces, and keyless entry. Optional equipment includes a 2.8 L Duramax I4 turbodiesel engine, remote start, a rear-view backup camera system, a premium Bose seven-speaker audio system, a GPS navigational radio with MyLink, and chrome exterior accessories. It is available as either an extended cab, or as a crew cab with either a short or long box.

The Z71 is the top-of-the-line trim level, and adds this to the LT trim level: unique aluminum-alloy wheels, vinyl and cloth combination seating surfaces, and a black front grille. Optional equipment is the same as the LT. It is available as either an extended cab, or as a crew cab with either a short or long box.

Later 2015 Colorado and Canyon models offered 4G LTE Wi-Fi capabilities through the OnStar system, standard on higher trim levels, and optional on lower trim levels. For 2016, trucks equipped with the eight-inch MyLink or GMC IntelliLink touchscreen infotainment system received standard Apple CarPlay and Android Auto smartphone integration.

Starting with the 2017 model year, base Colorado and Canyon models received a standard seven-inch Chevrolet MyLink (or GMC Intellilink) touchscreen infotainment system with Bluetooth for hands-free calling and wireless stereo audio streaming, Apple CarPlay and Android Auto smartphone integration, an A/M-F/M radio, and auxiliary and USB audio inputs, along with a six-speaker audio system. Most models also included a rear backup camera system. OnStar with 4G LTE Wi-Fi capabilities was optional on base Colorado and Canyon models.

The six-speed manual transmission was discontinued during the 2019 model year and is no longer available in the Colorado or Canyon.

Starting with the 2020 model year, both the 4x2 Z71 Extended Cab and Z71 crew-cab long-box models were removed from the lineup, along with the RST and Redline editions, as both will be combined with the luxury edition.

The ZR2 is the "off-road" trim level, and adds  to the Z/71 trim level: 2-inch taller suspension, 3.5-inch wider track, 31-inch off-road tires, unique aluminum-alloy wheels, leather-trimmed seating surfaces, functional rock sliders, Multimatic DSSV position-sensitive shock absorbers, aluminum skid plates to protect the radiator, oil pan, and front differential, locking front and rear differentials, and high approach-angle front bumper. Optional equipment is the same as the LT and Z/71 trim levels, except for the availability of a rear bed-mounted light bar. It is available as either an extended cab with a long box, or as a crew cab with a short box.

The 2021 model year Colorado will receive a refreshed look and an updated grille in line with the Chevrolet design language, but will see its level trims reduced to four: Work, LT, Z71, and ZR2. The 2WD base trim is eliminated.

In Mexico, three configurations are available: WT Double Cab, with a 2.5 L engine, six-speed automatic transmission, and rear wheel drive; the LT Double Cab, with a 2.5 L engine, six-speed automatic transmission, and rear wheel drive; and the LT Double Cab, with a 3.6L V6 engine, 8 speed automatic transmission, connectable  transmission and 4x4.

GMC Canyon

The all-new GMC Canyon was introduced on January 12, 2014. GMC introduced in an official press and video release and made its public debut the following day (January 13, 2014) at the North American International Auto Show in Detroit. Sales started at dealerships in the second quarter of 2014 as a 2015 model.

The Canyon offers the same features as its cousin, but will have a higher MSRP and more options. It also sports a front grille design that closely resembles its full-size sibling, the GMC Sierra. The Canyon comes in three trims and either two-wheel drive or four-wheel drive. The base model is only available with the 2.5 L Ecotec I4 engine, a 6-speed manual transmission (until mid-2019 when the manual transmission was discontinued and a six-speed automatic transmission became standard), and two-wheel drive.

Optional features (based on trim) will include active aero grille shutters, available OnStar 4G LTE connectivity with on-board wifi, forward collision warning, lane departure warning, and an available Teen Driver feature that limits speed and audio volume.

On February 16, 2015, GMC posted spy shots of a Canyon with Denali styling, indicating plans to add the mid-size truck to the Denali lineup as a 2016 model.

Both the Canyon and Colorado received a facelift for the 2021 model year, prior to the debut of a third generation in either the 2023 or 2024 model years.

GMC also saw its level trims reduced and renamed for the 2021 model year: Elevation Standard, Elevation, AT4, and Denali. The SLE and SLT trims are eliminated.

Colorado ZR2
The ZR2 concept was shown at the 2014 LA Auto Show. Due to positive feedback, a production ready version was introduced two years later at the 2016 LA Auto Show, which joined the 2017 lineup.

The Colorado ZR2 offers the same amenities as its brother the Z71, but is heavily tailored towards off-road performance. The ZR2 model is available in 2 body configurations; crew cab with 5 ft bed or extended cab with 6 ft bed. Engine options are the 3.6 L LGZ V6 engine and the 2.8 L Duramax LWN turbodiesel engine.

Chevrolet designed many new parts specifically for the ZR2 to improve off-road performance. New features and parts standard or optional on the ZR2 include:
 3.5" Wider Track
 2" Lift
 Multimatic Dynamic Suspension Spool Valve (DSSV)  Dampers
 Electronic Locking Front and Rear Differentials
 Longer, Cast Iron Control Arms
 Aggressive Front Bumper and Grille with Improved Approach Angle
 Redesigned Rear Bumper For Improved Departure Angle
 Cowl-Style Hood with Black Insert
 Wider Fender Flares
 Aluminum Skid Plates to protect radiator, oil pan, and front differential
 Rock Sliders
 New 17x8 Wheels with 31" (265/65R17) Goodyear Wrangler Duratrac tires
 "Off-road Mode" alters throttle progression, shift calibration, traction control, stability control, and ABS for different terrain.
 Optional Bed-Mounted Full Size Spare Tire
 Optional Carpet Delete

The 2018 Colorado ZR2 was featured in Season 9 Episode 99 of Motor Trend Head 2 Head, where it faced off against a 2017 Ram Power Wagon.

Colorado ZH2 (Military Truck)
GM Defense and U.S. Army TARDEC partnered in 2016 to develop and successfully test the Chevrolet Colorado ZH2 fuel cell electric truck, with low acoustical and heat signatures as well as the advantages of on-board water production, exportable electric power and off-road capability.

Infantry Squad Vehicle
The US Army's Infantry Squad Vehicle (ISV) is heavily based on the diesel variant of the ZR2, with 90% of the vehicle coming from Commercial Off-The-Shelf (COTS) components.

Engines

Third generation (2023) 

The third-generation Colorado and Canyon debuted in July 2022 for the 2023 model year.
 It shares its L3B engine with the full-size Silverado.

Sales

Awards and recognition
 Motor Trend'''s 2015 Truck of the Year
 Motor Trend'''s 2016 Truck of the Year

References

External links

 
 GMC Canyon (twin vehicle)

Colorado
Pickup trucks
2010s cars
2020s cars
Rear-wheel-drive vehicles
All-wheel-drive vehicles
Cars introduced in 2004
Cars of Brazil